Kelli Underwood (born 1977) is an Australian radio and television sports journalist and sportscaster specialising in Australian rules football, netball and tennis. She was the first woman to call an Australian Football League match on television and radio.

Underwood is host of ABC's Offsiders and a regular panelist on the Fox Sports program The Back Page. She also calls AFL and AFLW football on Fox Footy and ABC Grandstand.

Radio career 
Underwood's work began in regional radio at Murray Bridge, South Australia. She worked at Geelong station K-Rock before moving to 3AW in Melbourne as a sports reporter and AFL match day reporter.

Underwood is part of the ABC Radio Grandstand team, calling AFL games mainly on Friday nights.

Television career
Underwood's move into television began in 2006, when she joined Network Ten as a sports reporter for the 5pm Ten News bulletin and Sports Tonight out of Melbourne. She joined Network Ten's AFL coverage in 2009, replacing Christi Malthouse as a boundary rider.

Underwood made history becoming the first woman to call an AFL match on television, joining Tim Lane in commentary of the 2009 NAB Cup game between Geelong and the Adelaide Crows. She called her first AFL premiership season match on 18 July 2009 – the round 16 match between Geelong and Melbourne at Kardinia Park with Anthony Hudson. Underwood commentated for matches for Network Ten throughout 2009–10, both in the commentary box and at ground level through until the end of 2011.

Underwood was a host and commentator of ANZ Championship Netball from 2008 until 2016, calling for Network Ten and later Fox Sports.

In 2013, Underwood joined the revamped Fox Sports panel show The Back Page, which she continues to appear alongside host Tony Squires. Her work on The Back Page and her interview program Breaking Ground earned her two Astra Awards, including the 2015 award for Most Outstanding Female Presenter.

In 2017, she called the AFLW on Fox Footy being the station head caller for the competition, her role expanded in 2020 when she returned calling AFL men's football on television. In February 2018, Underwood replaced Gerard Whateley as host of Offsiders after he resigned from the ABC.

Personal life
Her partner Georgia Spokes is a senior editor at ABC News. They have a daughter.

References

1977 births
Australian rules football commentators
Australian women radio presenters
Australian television presenters
Australian women television presenters
Australian women journalists
Living people
Australian LGBT broadcasters
Australian netball commentators